Diphosgene is an organic chemical compound with the formula ClCO2CCl3.  This colorless liquid is a valuable reagent in the synthesis of organic compounds. Diphosgene is related to phosgene and has comparable toxicity, but is more conveniently handled because it is a liquid, whereas phosgene is a gas.

Production and uses
Diphosgene is prepared by radical chlorination of methyl chloroformate under UV light:

Cl-CO-OCH3 + 3 Cl2 —(hv)→ Cl-CO-OCCl3 + 3 HCl
Another method is the radical chlorination of methyl formate:

H-CO-OCH3 + 4 Cl2 —(hv)→ Cl-CO-OCCl3 + 4 HCl

Diphosgene converts to phosgene upon heating or upon catalysis with charcoal. It is thus useful for reactions traditionally relying on phosgene. For example, it convert amines into isocyanates, secondary amines into carbamoyl chlorides, carboxylic acids into acid chlorides, and formamides into isocyanides. Diphosgene serves as a source of two equivalents of phosgene:
2 RNH2 + ClCO2CCl3 → 2 RNCO + 4 HCl

With α-amino acids diphosgene gives the acid chloride-isocyanates, OCNCHRCOCl, or N-carboxy-amino acid anhydrides depending on the conditions.

It hydrolyzes to release HCl in humid air.

Diphosgene is used in some laboratory preparations because it is easier to handle than phosgene.

Role in warfare
Diphosgene was originally developed as a pulmonary agent for chemical warfare, a few months after the first use of phosgene. It was used as a poison gas in artillery shells by Germany during World War I. The first recorded battlefield use was in May 1916. Diphosgene was developed because the vapors could destroy the filters in gas masks in use at the time.

Safety
Diphosgene has a relatively high vapor pressure of 10 mm Hg (1.3 kPa) at 20 °C and decomposes to phosgene around 300 °C. Exposure to diphosgene is similar in hazard to phosgene.

See also
 Phosgene
 Triphosgene 
 Carbonyldiimidazole

References

External links
medical care guide.
NATO guide, includes treatment advice
material safety data sheet (PDF, for phosgene and diphosgene treated as one).
MSDS for diphosgene specifically

Pulmonary agents
Chloroformates
Trichloromethyl esters
Carbon oxohalides